{{DISPLAYTITLE:Rho1 Arae}}

Rho1 Arae is the Bayer designation for a star in the southern constellation of Ara. Unusually for a star with a Bayer designation, it was not catalogued by Bayer in his Uranometria. It was instead first catalogued by Nicolas Lacaille, in his Coelum Australe Stelliferum published in 1763. This star gained the Bayer designation of Rho1 Arae in Bode's Uranographia, published in 1801. Rho1 Arae is one of the dimmest stars with a Bayer designation, having an apparent visual magnitude of just +6.275 According to the Bortle Dark-Sky Scale, this means the star is just barely visible to the naked eye in dark rural skies. Based upon parallax measurements, it is about  distant from the Sun, give or take a 50-light-year margin of error.

This is a spectroscopic binary system, which means that the presence of an orbiting companion is indicated by shifts in the spectrum. The orbital period has been estimated at 0.439 day. The spectrum of this system matches a stellar classification of B3 Vnpe, which may indicate the primary is a B-type main-sequence star. The 'e' suffix indicates the presence of emission lines, indicating this is a Be star. For Rho1 Arae, the emission lines are prominent and variable.

Rho1 Arae has a peculiar velocity of  relative to its neighbors, making it a runaway star system. A scenario that it was ejected from the Scorpius–Centaurus OB association as a result of a past supernova explosion seems unlikely because of its binarity.

References

External links
 HR 6274
 HIP 82868
 Image HD 152478

Ara (constellation)
152478
Emission-line stars
082868
Arae, V846
6274
Arae, Rho1
Durchmusterung objects
B-type main-sequence stars